Yoshihiro Ito (伊藤 義弘, born June 2, 1982 in Fukuoka) is a Japanese former professional baseball pitcher who played for the Chiba Lotte Marines in Japan's Nippon Professional Baseball from 2008 to 2015.

External links

NPB

1982 births
Living people
Baseball people from Fukuoka Prefecture
Japanese baseball players
Nippon Professional Baseball pitchers
Chiba Lotte Marines players